Chaudhary Muhammad Tufail is a Pakistani politician who had been a member of the National Assembly of Pakistan, from September 2016 to May 2018.

Political career
He has served as Tehsil Nazim of Chichawatni.

He was elected to the National Assembly of Pakistan as a candidate of Pakistan Muslim League (N) (PML-N) from Constituency NA-162 (Sahiwal-III) in by elections held in September 2016. He received 76,580 votes and defeated Rai Murtaza Iqbal, a candidate of Pakistan Tehreek-e-Insaf (PTI). The seat became vacant after Rai Hassan Nawaz who won it in 2013 election, was disqualified to continue in office because of inaccurate assets declaration.

In October 2017, he was appointed as Federal Parliamentary Secretary for privatisation.

References

Living people
Pakistani MNAs 2013–2018
Pakistan Muslim League (N) politicians
People from Chichawatni
Year of birth missing (living people)